Linda Donnelly (born 21 October 1969) is a British swimmer. She competed in the women's 4 × 100 metre freestyle relay at the 1988 Summer Olympics.

References

External links
 

1969 births
Living people
British female swimmers
Olympic swimmers of Great Britain
Swimmers at the 1988 Summer Olympics
Sportspeople from Bellshill
British female freestyle swimmers
20th-century British women
21st-century British women